Jeremejevite is an aluminium borate mineral with variable fluoride and hydroxide ions. It is considered as one of the rarest, thus one of the most expensive stones. For nearly a century, it was considered as one of the rarest gemstones in the world.

It was first described in 1883 as small, single crystals in loose granitic debris  in Mt. Soktui, Nerschinsk district, Adun-Chilon Mountains, Siberia. It was named after Pavel Vladimirovich Eremeev, Russian mineralogist, engineer and professor, who collected the first specimens. (Jeremejev, German) (1830–1899).

Properties 
Jeremejevite is a mineral which shows pleochroic properties, which is an optical phenomenon meaning the color of the mineral appears as if it changes colors depending on the axis it is viewed on. Blue specimens from Namibia show a light cornflower blue to colorless to light yellow pleochroism, while yellow materials show light yellow to colorless pleochroism. This mineral is piezoelectric, meaning that if it is under mechanical stress, it generates electricity.

Mining and localities 
Jeremejevite occurs as a late hydrothermal phase in granitic pegmatites in association with albite, tourmaline, quartz and rarely gypsum. It has also been reported in the Pamir Mountains of Tajikistan, Namibia and in micro-crystalline form at the Eifel district, Germany. Later, there was a new source revealed in Namibia, near Usakos in 2001. Nowadays, most of the stones on the market are from that deposit.

Jewelry industry 

As an OH-end member, scientists have been able to synthesize jeremejevite, but only in micro-crystalline form, without fluorine. This synthesized variant of the mineral has no use in the jewelry industry.

Typically, faceted gems can reach up to 5 carats, but usually they range between less than 1 carat and 2 carats. However, new sources produced much larger faceted stones, the biggest faceted gem weighing 254 carats. This gem was found in Sri Lanka in 1990.

Even though jeremejevite is a relatively durable stone, it should not be cleaned using ultrasound cleaning or steaming; the stone usually contains liquid inclusions, which could shatter the stone if cleaned using these methods. It is recommended to clean them with warm water, a mild detergent, and a soft brush instead.

Due to its high value and rarity, it is considered a collectors' stone, who purchase it in mineral form, hence only a few specimens had been faceted so far.

References

Borate minerals
Hexagonal minerals
Minerals in space group 176